Hewlett-Packard's line of digital cameras is called PhotoSmart
The company also makes a line of consumer-based photo printers under the same branding.

Digital cameras

The original HP digital camera was an Intel Miniature card-based model simply called the Photosmart.  It was a VGA-resolution camera with a simple LCD.
The company later broadened its line with a number of series of cameras, all using the Photosmart name.

HP announced on November 7th, 2007 that it will seek an alternative business model for its HP-branded cameras and was working to identify an original equipment manufacturer (OEM) partner that would be licensed to design, source and distribute digital cameras under the HP brand.

List of models 

 HP PhotoSmart 215
 HP PhotoSmart 215
 HP PhotoSmart 315
 HP PhotoSmart 318
 HP PhotoSmart 320
 HP Photosmart 335
 HP PhotoSmart 433
 HP PhotoSmart 435

 HP PhotoSmart 612/612xi
 HP Photosmart 618/618xi
 HP PhotoSmart 620/620v
 HP PhotoSmart 635
 HP PhotoSmart 715
 HP PhotoSmart 720
 HP PhotoSmart 733
 HP PhotoSmart 735
 HP PhotoSmart 812/812xi
 HP PhotoSmart 850
 HP PhotoSmart 912/912xi
 HP PhotoSmart 935
 HP PhotoSmart 945 (also HP PhotoSmart C945 according to Exif data)
 HP Photosmart 970cxi
 HP Photosmart 1000
 HP Photosmart 3310 
 HP PhotoSmart 7450
 HP Photosmart 7520
 HP Photosmart 7525

HP C series

 HP PhotoSmart (C5340A) – identical to Konica Q-EZ
 HP PhotoSmart C20 (C5384A) – identical to Konica Q-M100
 HP PhotoSmart C30 (C5386A) – identical to Konica Q-M100V
 HP PhotoSmart C200 (C7294A) – identical to Konica Q-M200
 HP PhotoSmart C20xi
 HP PhotoSmart C30xi
 HP PhotoSmart C4200
 HP PhotoSmart C4440
 HP PhotoSmart C500/C500xi
 HP PhotoSmart C5280
 HP PhotoSmart C618 — identical to Pentax EI-200

 HP PhotoSmart C912 — identical to Pentax EI-2000
 HP PhotoSmart C945 (V01.47)
 HP PhotoSmart C6380
 HP PhotoSmart C4480

HP E series
 HP Photosmart E217
 HP Photosmart E317
 HP Photosmart E327
 HP Photosmart E337
 HP Photosmart E427 and HP Photosmart M537: 6-megapixel digital cameras running on AA batteries and supporting the SD memory card technology.

HP M series
 HP Photosmart M22
 HP Photosmart M23
 HP Photosmart M305
 HP Photosmart M307

 HP Photosmart M407/M407xi (4.1 megapixel, SD card, two AA batteries)
 HP Photosmart M415
 HP Photosmart M417
 HP Photosmart M425 (introduced in 2006, 5 megapixels, MultiMediaCard and SD card) 
 HP Photosmart M437
 HP Photosmart M447
 HP Photosmart M517
 HP Photosmart M525
 HP Photosmart M527
 HP Photosmart M537
 HP Photosmart M547
 HP Photosmart M627
 HP Photosmart M637
 HP Photosmart M737
 HP Photosmart Mz67

HP R series
The R series was HP's top line of cameras.
 HP Photosmart R507
 HP Photosmart R607

 HP Photosmart R707
 HP Photosmart R717
 HP Photosmart R725
 HP Photosmart R727
 HP Photosmart R742
 HP Photosmart R817

 HP Photosmart R818
 HP Photosmart R827
 HP Photosmart R837
 HP Photosmart R847
 HP Photosmart R927 (video capability with a VGA resolution of 640 x 480 at 24 frames per second)
 HP Photosmart R937
 HP Photosmart R967

Other HP cameras
 HP Photosmart 3210
 HP Photosmart 3310
 HP Photosmart 1400/1410

HP-branded cameras
 HP CA340
 HP CA350
 HP CB350
 HP CC330
 HP CC450
 HP CW450
 HP CW450t
 HP PB360t/PW360t
 HP PC460t
 HP PW460t
 HP PW550
 HP SB360
 HP SW350
 HP SW450
 HP c200
 HP c500
 HP s300 Black, Also known as Casio Exilim QV-R100, AIGO DC-F500, Haier S68
 HP s500 Black

E-series

References

See also 
 List of Hewlett-Packard products - From 2006, some HP printers were named 'Photosmart'